Sihala is a town and union council located in Islamabad Capital Territory, Pakistan, with a population of just over 25,000. It is geographically situated on Kahuta Road and Islamabad Expressway.

Sihala connects Rawalpindi, Punjab to Azad Kashmir via Kahuta Road. It is the location of the largest police training college in Pakistan, a railway station, a Pakistan State Oil depot, a Military Engineering Service supply center, and the Capital University of Science & Technology.

References 

Union councils of Islamabad Capital Territory
Villages in Islamabad Capital Territory